Edgerton Park is a former Rochester Industrial and Rapid Transit Railway station located in Rochester, New York. Until summer 1938 the station had been named Felix Street. Other destinations at the station included Edgerton Park Arena. The station was closed in 1956, along with the arena and the rest of the line and coinciding with the fair's relocation to new facilities in suburban Henrietta.

Immediately north of the station, there was City of Rochester siding which serviced facilities that still exist in the area. Farther north, towards Emerson station, there was a surface freight spur line running north along Dewey Avenue to Kodak Park.

References

Railway stations in Rochester, New York
Railway stations in the United States opened in 1918
Railway stations closed in 1956
1918 establishments in New York (state)
1956 disestablishments in New York (state)